Amber Cove is a cruise terminal in Puerto Plata Province in the Dominican Republic.

 
The terminal includes lodging and retail stores.

References

External links

Ports and harbours of the Dominican Republic
Resorts in the Dominican Republic
Puerto Plata Province